Furkan Haltalı (born December 2, 2002) is a Turkish professional basketball player who plays as a Center for Anadolu Efes of the Basketbol Süper Ligi (BSL) on a loan from Beşiktaş Emlakjet.

Professional career

Years in Bandırma (2016–2020) 
Furkan Haltalı started his professional career at Bandırma Kırmızı in 2017–18 season and stayed with this club two seasons.

Beşiktaş (2020–present)
On August 8, 2020, he has signed with Beşiktaş Icrypex of the Basketbol Süper Ligi (BSL).

Loan to Anadolu Efes (2022–present)
On December 27, 2022, he loaned to Anadolu Efes of the Basketbol Süper Ligi (BSL), until the end of season, in exchange for Egemen Güven and Ömercan İlyasoğlu.

References

External links
Furkan Haltalı Champions League Profile
Furkan Haltalı TBLStat.net Profile
Furkan Haltalı Eurobasket Profile
Furkan Haltalı TBL Profile

Living people
2002 births
Anadolu Efes S.K. players
Bandırma B.İ.K. players
Bandırma Kırmızı B.K. players
Beşiktaş men's basketball players
Centers (basketball)
Sportspeople from Konya
Turkish men's basketball players